HMS Badsworth (pennant number L03) was an escort destroyer of the Type II Hunt class. The Royal Navy ordered Badsworths construction three months after the outbreak of the Second World War. Cammell Laird laid down her keel at their Birkenhead yard on 15 May 1940, as Admiralty Job No. J3260 (Yard No. 1055). After a successful Warship Week national savings campaign in March 1942, Badsworth was adopted by the civil community of Batley, then in the West Riding of Yorkshire. The ship was named after a fox-hunt in Yorkshire.

Badsworth began her career on convoy duty in the North Western Approaches. However, in June 1942 she took up the role of close escort in Convoy Harpoon, aiming to deliver vital supplies to the beleaguered island of Malta. The convoy met fierce attacks from the besieging Italian and German forces with only two out of the initial six merchant ships reaching Malta.  Whilst entering the Grand Harbour Badsworth struck a mine, sustaining heavy damage. She was towed back for temporary repairs, afterwards leaving the island and heading towards Tyne for further repairs. In November 1942 Badsworth rejoined the Londonderry Escort Force by escorting a convoy headed to Murmansk.  In March 1943 she returned to the Mediterranean for another Malta convoy, striking another mine on 22 April 1943. Towed to Liverpool for repairs, the Badsworth was then transferred to the exiled Royal Norwegian Navy under the name HNoMS Arendal.

Career

Early operations
On 18 August 1941 upon build completion, and final trials the Badsworth proceeded to Scapa Flow. Throughout September, the ship was readied for operational service, joining the Londonderry Escort Force. Badsworth was deployed for close convoy defence in the north-west approaches.

On 13 December Badsworth joined military convoy WS14 in its passage from the Clyde to the north west approaches for ocean escort duties with the battleship  and the destroyer . Badsworth detached from WS-14 on 21 December with the armed merchant cruiser , Beaufort and the local escort on arrival to Freetown.

Service in the Arctic
The passage from West Africa to resume convoy defence at Derry was completed in January 1942, with the Badsworth being deployed in continuation at Derry in February. On 25 March Newport retired to the Clyde after colliding with Beverley. The local escort, Badsworth included, detached from the convoy on 27 March.

During April, Badsworth was nominated for detached service in support of a planned combined services operation, named Operation Myrmidon. The destroyer escorted the infantry landing ships  and her sister-ship  with four other Hunt-class destroyers to attack shipping in Bayonne, by Number One and Number Six Commando Units. The raid was unsuccessful both because of weather conditions and due to the enemy’s state of alert. Released early from Myrmidon, Badsworth returned to Derry, joining military convoy WS-18 on 18 April with the destroyers  ,  and Lancaster. The escorting ships detached from VB-18 with same ships and returned to Clyde.

Badsworth was then nominated for escort duties for the Russian convoy routes. On 2 May the Badsworth found herself under sustained attacks by aircraft and submarines. The merchant vessel  was hit, and settled down by her bow. The merchantman sank slowly, and Badsworth was ordered to sink her by gunfire. During one of these sorties, Badsworth dropped depth charges, seeing a periscope shortly afterwards she counterattacked, dropping two Patterns. The destroyer reported that the submarine blew its tanks, but nothing appeared. Badsworth was unable to further the attack as the destroyer's asdic broke down.

On 5 May the destroyer was detached from PQ 15 upon arrival at Murmansk. Badsworth remained in North Russia until 21 May, when she joined the ocean escort for the return convoy QP-12, with Ulster Queen, the destroyers Venomous, Boadicea,  and St Albans. The convoy also included the minesweeper   and three trawlers. On 27 May, Badsworth detached herself from the convoy, along with Venomous and Ulster Queen.

Escort and patrol duties in the Mediterranean

On 29 May, Badsworth was chosen for far escort duties of supply convoy to Malta, as part of Operation Harpoon. After preparing for the Mediterranean duties at Derry, on 6 June the destroyer joined Convoy WS-19S in the north west approaches as part of Ocean Escort for passage to Gibraltar. The ships set out of Gibraltar escorting the convoy through the Sicilian narrows.

On 14 June, Badsworth was under heavy air attack, which damaged   forcing her return to Gibraltar. The day after found the convoy in action with Italian warships in their attempt to intercept and sink the convoy. On 16 June, Badsworth suffered major structural damage after she detonated a mine whilst entering Grand Harbour, Malta. The destroyer entered the harbour with the two merchantmen that survived the convoy. The ships’ night time arrival, along with errors in the signals received for a mine-swept path caused the convoy to pass through a minefield. ORP Kujawiak was sunk after detonating a mine, while  Matchless, the minesweeper Hebe and the merchantman  were also damaged.

Badsworth had twelve by fifteen foot gash torn in her forward structure below the waterline. Among the fourteen casualties were some survivors from the merchant ships sunk during the passage to Malta. The day after the arrival, the destroyer was docked and taken for repairs at HM Dockyard, Malta. Temporary repairs to allow a return to Great Britain took until 11 August, when Badsworth left Malta, along with the Matchless  as escorts for two merchantmen to Gibraltar. The ships were tagged as Force Y, as part of Operation Ascendant. These ships were the only remaining survivors of the Harpoon convoy. Their passage back to Gibraltar was deliberately planned to coincide with that of the next Malta relief convoy, Operation Pedestal.  During the passage close to the North African coast, Italian recognition marks were painted on Badsworth’s forecastle. The ships arrived at Gibraltar on 15 August, with Badsworth leaving harbour three days later, heading for the United Kingdom for repairs. On 25 August, Badsworth entered the North Shields commercial shipyard for repairs. 

Repairs continued until November, with post refit trails and the preparations for operational service ending in December. Badsworth  rejoined the Londonderry Escort Force for convoy defence in the North Atlantic. Badsworth detached from WS-25 along with the other destroyers and returned to the Clyde on 24 December.

From January to February 1943, Badsworth continued to provide defence for Atlantic convoys. However, she was transferred to the Mediterranean for escort and support duties with the 60th Destroyer Division. Badsworth then detached from the joint convoy with other ships bound for Gibraltar, as part of KMF11.

Badsworth  was thence deployed in the Western Mediterranean for convoy defence and patrol. On 22 April, she was mined at Bône, Algeria, sustaining major structural damage in her aft section. Badsworth’s starboard engine was immobilised, with both shafts distorted. The ship was beached, and had to be refloated and towed back into harbour by the minesweeper . Temporary repairs were made in Malta during May, upon completion Badsworth was towed back to the United Kingdom by the tug Frisky as part of Convoy MKS-15. The destroyer was taken in hand for extensive repairs at a commercial shipyard in Liverpool in July. The destroyer was paid off from Royal Navy service and transferred on loan to the Royal Norwegian Navy on 8 August 1944. Badsworth  was renamed as HNoMS Arendal. The ship was decommissioned from the Royal Navy on 16 November 1944.

Duties under Norwegian command, and later career

In September, Arendal was nominated for duty with the 16th Destroyer Flotilla, based at Harwich, after completing the shipyard work, carrying out the harbour trial, a post refit trial, the destroyer was ready again for operational service, joining the flotilla at Harwich for patrol and escort duties in the North Sea and the Channel.

The destroyer saw action on 25 March 1945 against minelaying E-Boats in the Thames Estuary with the Polish destroyer ORP Krakowiak. The continuation of the ship’s loan to the Royal Norwegian Navy was approved after VE Day, with the ship continuing to be deployed with the Royal Norwegian Navy on loan from the Royal Navy. Arendal was a destroyer escort in Operation Kingdom, the embarkation of the Crown Prince of Norway aboard  for his return to Oslo. After her return to Norway Arendal made a return trip to the UK, when she sailed in September 1945 to Leith and retrieved 400 urns containing the ashes of Norwegians who had died in the UK during the war. The urns were placed 40 each in 10 crates on the aft deck, each of the crates decorated with a large flower bouquet. Before the ship left port with her cargo a Norwegian priest belonging to the Norwegian Church Abroad held a service on board. When the destroyer arrived in Oslo she was met by King Haakon VII, Crown Prince Olav, Prince Harald and Bishop Eivind Berggrav, as well as military units and a large crowd of people. Arendal also escorted landing vessels from the United Kingdom to Norway, the landing vessels having been bought by the Norwegian government for conversion to coastal ferries and cargo vessels. On several occasions Arendal sailed to Germany, escorting vessels carrying German soldiers being repatriated to Bremerhaven in north-western Germany. Arendal was bought by Norway after the end of hostilities, in 1946. The ship remained in operational use as an escort destroyer until 1956, when she was classified as a frigate. Arendal was used as a training ship for cadets, before being removed from the active list in 1961. She was scrapped in 1965.

Notes 

a.  The Royal Navy submarine  was also present with the convoy initially, as was the cruiser . Transit of the convoy was partially covered by ships of the Home Fleet.

Citations

Bibliography

External links

   The official despatch to the Admiralty describing Operation Harpoon.
 The Hunt (Type II) class Escort destroyers
 La Battaglia di Mezzo Giugno 

 

Hunt-class destroyers of the Royal Navy
Ships built on the River Mersey
1941 ships
World War II destroyers of the United Kingdom
Hunt-class destroyers of the Royal Norwegian Navy
World War II destroyers of Norway
Royal Navy ship names